Fernando Ortiz (born December 25, 1977) is an Argentine former footballer and the current manager of Mexican club América.

Playing career

Ortiz was spotted by Argentine giants Boca Juniors in 1997. He made his debut in 1998, and helped Boca to win the Primera División 1998 Apertura championship. He played 8 games for Boca in all competitions, scoring three goals.

In 1999, he was loaned to RCD Mallorca in Spain, where he played half-a-season for their B team (RCD Mallorca B). He returned that same year to Argentina to play for San Lorenzo. Subsequently, he had spells at Unión de Santa Fe and Banfield, before joining Estudiantes de La Plata in 2004.

Ortiz helped Estudiantes to win the 2006 Apertura. He was a starter in the championship playoff played against his former club Boca Juniors on December 13, that Estudiantes won 2–1. Shortly after being crowned champion in Argentina, Ortiz signed with Mexican side Santos Laguna along with other players in order to help the team avoid relegation. He left Santos Laguna to join Club América on December 17, 2008.

In August 2010, Ortiz returned to Argentina to play for Vélez Sársfield. Ortiz was a regular starter along Sebastián Domínguez in Vélez Sársfield's centre back during his two-year stay at the club, in which he won with the team the 2011 Clausura and reached the semifinals of the 2011 Copa Libertadores and quarter-finals of the 2012 Copa Libertadores.

Aged 34, Ortiz did not renew his contract with Vélez after it expired in June 2012, signing instead for Racing. However, despite a "free agent", Racing had to pay a fee to Sud América, a proxy club for an unknown third parties. Racing received a warning for the transfer. After not being able to fully recover from a knee injury, he officially announced his retirement in 2014, and began his studies to become a coach.

Managerial career

Ortiz began his managerial career in 2016, being in charge of the Estudiantes reserve side. His first role as manager of a senior squad came the following year, being appointed manager of Paraguayan side Sol de América. He had a brief stint with Sportivo Luqueño in 2018 before returning to Sol de América that same year.

In January 2022, Ortiz moved to Mexico and was announced as the new head coach of the Club América under-20 side. On 3 March, Ortiz was appointed interim manager of the first team following the dismissal of Santiago Solari.

Managerial statistics

Honours

Club
Boca Juniors
Argentine Primera División (1): 1998 Apertura
Estudiantes LP
Argentine Primera División (1): 2006 Apertura
Santos Laguna
Mexican Primera División (1): 2008 Clausura
Vélez Sársfield
Argentine Primera División (1): 2011 Clausura

Individual
Mexican Primera División Best Central Defender: 2008 Clausura

References

External links
  
 
  
 

Living people
1977 births
Sportspeople from Córdoba Province, Argentina
Argentine footballers
Argentine expatriate footballers
Association football defenders
Argentine Primera División players
Boca Juniors footballers
San Lorenzo de Almagro footballers
Unión de Santa Fe footballers
Club Atlético Banfield footballers
Estudiantes de La Plata footballers
Club Atlético Vélez Sarsfield footballers
Racing Club de Avellaneda footballers
RCD Mallorca B players
Liga MX players
Santos Laguna footballers
Club América footballers
Tigres UANL footballers
Expatriate footballers in Spain
Expatriate footballers in Mexico
Argentine expatriate sportspeople in Mexico
Argentine expatriate sportspeople in Spain
Club Sol de América managers
Sportivo Luqueño managers